Paulista Futebol Clube, Paulista de Jundiaí, or Paulista as they are usually called, is a Brazilian football team from Jundiaí, in São Paulo, founded on 17 May 1909. They currently play in the Paulistão Segunda Divisão, the fourth tier of the São Paulo state league.

Home stadium is the Jayme Cintra stadium, capacity 15,000. They play in black, white and red stripes, white shorts and socks.

History
In 1903, Companhia Paulista de Estradas de Ferro ("São Paulo Railroad Company") employees founded Jundiahy Football Club. In 1908, due to the lack of time of its members, Jundiahy Football Club folded. Supporters, sympathizers and players of the defunct Jundiahy founded Paulista Futebol Clube on 17 May 1909.

The team made its first participation in the Campeonato Paulista in 1926, in the amateur, LAF-organized championship. Paulista would subsequently participate in all four LAF championships, usually finishing in the lower rungs of the table, with the exception of the 1927 championship, where the team finished in third place. After that, Paulista only returned to the first level in 1969, and stayed there until its relegation in 1978.

Paulista would eventually return in 1985, only to be relegated in the following year. In 1993, with the downsizing of the first two levels, Paulista found itself relegated to the third level. In 1995, after securing promotion in the state league, Paulista, now under the name of Lousano Paulista, participated in the Campeonato Brasileiro Série C for the first time, reaching the Round of 32. After reaching this round again in the following year, the team would suffer two consecutive first round eliminations in 1997 and 1998. In 1999, the team, now sponsored by Parmalat, changed its name to Etti Jundiaí.

The club would have its period of greatest success in the early 2000s. In 2000, the team pulled a strong performance in the Copa João Havelange's Green and White Module, reaching the third stage, only missing out on qualification for the module finals in the last round, and in the next year, followed that up with the title of the Campeonato Paulista Série A2 and the title in the Série C.

In 2002, the team participated in the last Rio-São Paulo Tournament, reaching 8th place, and in the second semester, reached the semifinals of the Série B, being eliminated by Fortaleza on a 3-8 aggregate score. However, in the following three years, Paulista wouldn't top these performances, consistently failing in reaching the Second phase, but it would have better successes in the state competitions, where it reached the Finals of the 2004 Campeonato Paulista, losing to São Caetano in the finals.

In 2005, the club won the Copa do Brasil, beating Fluminense in the final. In 2006, Paulista competed in the Copa Libertadores for the first time, being eliminated in the first stage by River Plate and Club Libertad, despite securing a 2 to 1 victory over the former. In the same year, the club narrowly missed out on promotion to the Série A, tying in points with América de Natal and losing only on number of wins.

In 2007, Paulista was relegated back to the Série C. Subsequently, the team failed in keeping itself in the Série C, after a first-phase elimination, but it continued in the Paulista first level until its relegation in 2013. The team was then relegated twice in a row between 2016 and 2017, reaching the fourth level for the first time, until being promoted back to the third level in 2019.

Club name
Founded as Paulista, the team had various names in the 1990s. In 1995, the name was Lousano Paulista. In 1999, with the support of Parmalat, the name of the team was Etti Jundiaí, since Paulista is the name of a Parmalat competitor. In 2002, the team lost the support of Parmalat and the name of the team became just Jundiaí. In 2003, the team name was changed back to Paulista Futebol Clube.

Achievements
Copa do Brasil: 1
2005

Campeonato Brasileiro Série C: 1
2001

Campeonato Paulista Série A2: 4
1919, 1921, 1968, 2001

Copa Paulista: 3
1999, 2010, 2011

Copa São Paulo de Juniores: 1
1997

Campeonato Paulista Segunda Divisão: 1
2019

Stadium

Paulista's stadium is Estádio Jayme Cintra, inaugurated in 1957, with a maximum capacity of 15,000 people.

Squad

2005 Copa do Brasil
Paulista won the Copa do Brasil 2005, playing the following matches:

References

External links
Official Website

 
Association football clubs established in 1909
Football clubs in São Paulo (state)
1909 establishments in Brazil
Copa do Brasil winning clubs